Luigi Moltrasio (17 January 1928 – 28 March 1990) was an Italian footballer who played as a midfielder. He represented the Italy national football team three times, the first being on 5 December 1954, the occasion of a friendly match against Argentina in a 2–0 home win.

Honours

Player
Lazio
Coppa Italia: 1958

References

1928 births
1990 deaths
Italian footballers
Italy international footballers
Association football midfielders
Como 1907 players
U.S. Salernitana 1919 players
S.S. Lazio players
Torino F.C. players